"Navy Blue" is the debut studio album by American performer Diane Renay, released in 1964. It included two Top 40 hits, "Navy Blue" and "Kiss Me Sailor."

Release
The album was released in 1964 following the worldwide success of "Navy Blue." It reached number 54 on the Billboard Top LPs chart (now called The Billboard Hot 200), spending 11 weeks on the chart.

Both of the album's singles were featured on the girl-group anthology "Growin' Up Too Fast."

Critical reception
The album is retrospectively regarded as a girl-pop classic.

Track listing

References

1964 albums
Pop albums by American artists